"Heatwave" is a single from British grime artist Wiley, featuring vocals from Ms D – known for singing on the Chipmunk song "Oopsy Daisy". It was released as the lead single from his ninth studio album The Ascent on 27 July 2012 for digital download in the United Kingdom. It was written by Wiley, Dayo Olatunji and produced by Rymez, who is unofficially credited as a featured artist. "Heatwave" received major radio airplay, while managing to enter on BBC Radio 1's A-list. The song debuted at number 1 on the UK Singles Chart on 5 August 2012, selling over 114,000 copies, while becoming Wiley's first ever solo number 1.

Music video
A music video to accompany the release of "Heatwave" was first released onto YouTube on 29 June 2012 at a total length of three minutes and twenty-one seconds.

Critical reception
Lewis Corner of Digital Spy gave the song a neutral review, calling it "a suitably cool summer jam, but if Wiley really wants to make an impact like his peers, he's going to have to dial the temperature up just a little bit higher yet. ."

Chart performance
"Heatwave" was number 1 on the Wednesday and Friday UK midweek chart. As predicted, the song entered the UK Singles Chart on 5 August 2012 at number 1, spending two weeks there (holding off "We'll Be Coming Back" by Calvin Harris and Example). "Heatwave" sold over 114,000 copies in its first week of release and became Wiley's first ever solo number 1 single. In the second week of release, Wiley remained at number 1, selling another 66,000. The song has sold 416,000 copies in the UK as of December 2012, and was the 38th best-selling single of 2012.

Track listings

Credits and personnel
 Vocals – Wiley and Ms D
 Producer – Rymez
 Lyrics – Richard Cowie
 Label: Warner Music Group

Charts

Weekly charts

Year-end charts

Certifications

Release history

References

2012 singles
Wiley (musician) songs
Dyo (singer) songs
Number-one singles in Scotland
UK Singles Chart number-one singles
2012 songs
Songs written by Wiley (musician)